Debora Moore (born 1960, St. Louis, Missouri) is a contemporary glass artist. She is best known for her glass orchids.

Biography
Moore was born into a military family in St. Louis, Missouri. She was the third of six children, and spent many summers with her grandparents while she was growing up. Her career as an artist was influenced by her grandparents' garden and public art classes she took while visiting them. Before becoming a glass artist, she worked a number of jobs, including waiting tables and modeling. She is married to glass artist Benjamin Moore.

She owns Fiori Studio, located in Seattle, WA.

Career
Moore started working with glass in the 1980s. She took classes at the Pratt Fine Arts Center in Seattle, WA, as part of a work-study grant she received, then won a scholarship in 1990 to blow glass at Pilchuck Glass School, near Seattle. There she worked with Italo Scanga and Paul Marioni, and was a member of Dale Chihuly's glassblowing team. Moore has taught glassmaking at a number of programs, including the Pratt Fine Arts Center and Pilchuck; she worked with at-risk students at the Hilltop School in Tacoma, WA. She has participated in several artist-in-residence and visiting artist programs at the Chrysler Museum of Art, Norfolk, VA; the Museum of Glass, Tacoma, WA; and the Harbourfront Centre, Toronto, Canada. Notably, she was the first woman, and the first African American, to be a resident at Abate Zanetti, Murano, Italy.

Moore began making glass flowers in 1987, and is best known for her orchids. She uses glassblowing and hot sculpting at the furnace to "retain the pure brilliance of glass." She travels around the world to study and sketch orchids in their natural habitats, and is also inspired by the glass botanical models created by Leopold and Rudolf Blaschka. However, Moore uses her impressions and imagination to create orchids that recall the flowers' forms without restricting herself to scientific accuracy.

Recognition 
Moore has won a number of awards and honors, including the 2008 American Style Award from Habatat Galleries, Royal Oak, MI; the 2007 Rakow Commission for The Corning Museum of Glass, Corning, NY; and the Critics Award at the 35th International Glass Invitational, Royal Oak, MI. She has participated in solo and group exhibitions around the world in museums such as the Chrysler Museum of Art; the Northwest African American Museum, Seattle, WA; the Museum of Glass; the Glasmuseet Ebeltoft, Ebeltoft, Denmark; and the Muskegon Museum of Art, Muskegon, MI. Her work is in a number of permanent collections, including The Corning Museum of Glass, the Chrysler Museum of Art, the New Britain Museum of American Art, and the Crocker Art Museum.

On October 13, 2020, she was a speaker at the Virtual Preview Forces of Nature: Renwick Invitational 2020.

Her pieces, Cherry and Pink Lady Slipper Branch, were acquired by the Smithsonian American Art Museum as part of the Renwick Gallery's 50th Anniversary Campaign.

References

Further reading

External links
Host IX-Epidendrum; About the artist: Debra Moore, GlassApp, Corning Museum of Glass

American glass artists
Women glass artists
Living people
American artists
American women artists
1960 births
African-American women artists
Recipients of the Rakow Commission
21st-century African-American people
21st-century African-American women
20th-century African-American people
20th-century African-American women